James Austin Gleason (May 23, 1882 – April 12, 1959) was an American actor, playwright and screenwriter born in New York City. Gleason often portrayed "tough-talking, world-weary guys with a secret heart-of-gold."

Life and career

Gleason was born in New York City, the son of Mina (née Crolius) and William L. Gleason. Coming from theatrical stock, as a schoolboy he made stage appearances while on holiday. He began earning his living at the age of thirteen, being a messenger boy, printer's devil, assistant in an electrical store and a lift boy. He enlisted in the United States Army at age 16 and served three years in the Philippines.

On discharge, he began his stage career, later taking it up professionally. He played in London for two years and following his return to the United States, he began in films by writing dialogue for comedies. He wrote a number of plays, several of which were performed on Broadway.  He also acted on Broadway, including in a couple of his own plays. When World War I broke out, Gleason reenlisted in the United States Army and served to the end of the war.

His film debut was in Polly of the Follies (1922), starring Constance Talmadge. Balding and slender with a craggy voice and a master of the double-take, Gleason portrayed tough but warm-hearted characters, usually with a New York background. He co-wrote The Broadway Melody, the second film to win the Academy Award for Best Picture, and had a small uncredited role in it.  He also co-wrote and briefly appeared as a hot dog vendor in the 1934 Janet Gaynor vehicle Change of Heart.  He performed in a number of films with his wife Lucile. In The Clock (1945), he played a milk cart driver who gives lessons in marriage to the characters played by Judy Garland and Robert Walker, while Lucile played his wife. The same year, he played the bartender in the film adaptation of A Tree Grows in Brooklyn. In the Frank Capra classic Meet John Doe, he played the cynical, "hard boiled" editor brought in to pump up the newspaper that runs with the "John Doe" story.

Gleason was nominated for an Academy Award for Best Supporting Actor for his performance as boxing manager Max "Pop" Corkle in the 1941 film Here Comes Mr. Jordan. He starred in two movie series, playing police inspector Oscar Piper in six Hildegarde Withers mystery films during the 1930s, starting with The Penguin Pool Murder, and Joe Higgins in the first seven of nine films about the Higgins Family, in which his wife Lucile and son Russell played Lil and Sydney Higgins. One of Gleason's best-known roles is Uncle Birdie, the kind-hearted ship captain plagued by alcohol and the memory of his deceased wife, in Charles Laughton's film noir classic The Night of the Hunter (1955).

Gleason also performed in other media. In 1931, he co-starred with Robert Armstrong in the radio sitcom Gleason and Armstrong. His television credits include several episodes of Alfred Hitchcock Presents, the Reed Hadley legal drama The Public Defender and ABC's The Real McCoys. In "The Child", the Christmas 1957 episode of John Payne's The Restless Gun on NBC, Gleason and Anthony Caruso played Roman Catholic priests who run an orphanage. Dan Blocker, just launching his acting career, also guest starred in the episode.

Gleason died in 1959 from complications related to asthma, and was buried in Holy Cross Cemetery in Culver City, California.

For his contributions to the motion picture industry, Gleason has a star on the Hollywood Walk of Fame at 7038 Hollywood Boulevard.

Family
James and Lucile Gleason had a son, actor Russell Gleason.  On December 26, 1945, the younger Gleason was in New York City awaiting deployment to Europe with his regiment, when he fell out of a fourth story window in the Hotel Sutton — which the army had commandeered to house the troops — resulting in his death.  Reports varied, some saying the fall was accidental, while others stating it was a suicide. Russell's most prominent role had been as Muller in the Academy Award-winning version of All Quiet on the Western Front (1930). Russell Gleason was married to Cynthia Hobart (later becoming Cynthia Lindsay), a swimmer and stunt woman who later wrote a biography of family friend Boris Karloff.

James Gleason was interred in the Holy Cross Cemetery in Culver City, California.

Filmography

See also
 List of actors with Academy Award nominations

References

External links

 
 

1882 births
1959 deaths
American military personnel of the Spanish–American War
United States Army personnel of World War I
20th-century American male actors
20th-century American dramatists and playwrights
American male film actors
American male radio actors
American male stage actors
American male television actors
Deaths from asthma
Male actors from New York City
Burials at Holy Cross Cemetery, Culver City
American Roman Catholics